Agil Mammadov, born 12 April 1972 is an Azerbaijani former football player and current manager. He most recently was manager of Sumgayit FK in the Azerbaijan Premier League.

Managerial career
On 8 October 2015, Mammadov resigned as manager of Sumgayit.

Honours
Shamkir
 Azerbaijan Premier League (1): 2001–02
Neftchi Baku
 Azerbaijan Premier League (1): 2003–04
 Azerbaijan Cup (1): 2003–04

References

External links
Profile on Sumgayit's Official Site

Living people
1972 births
Soviet footballers
Azerbaijani footballers
Azerbaijan international footballers
Azerbaijani football managers
Qarabağ FK players
People from Sumgait
Soviet Azerbaijani people
Association football midfielders
Neftçi PFK players